McFarlane is a surname. Notable people with the surname include:

Politics 
 Allan McFarlane (1792–1864), pastoralist and parliamentarian in South Australia
 Brendan McFarlane (born 1951), Irish republican activist
 Hugh McFarlane (1815–1882), American politician
 Jann McFarlane (born 1944), Australian politician from Stirling, Western Australia
 Jean McFarlane, Baroness McFarlane of Llandaff (contemporary, 1926–2012), British peer; MP from Llandaff
 Norm McFarlane (contemporary), Canadian politician; mayor of Saint John, New Brunswick
 Robert McFarlane (1937–2022), American National Security Advisor to President Reagan 1983–1985; major player in the Iran-Contra Affair
 William D. McFarlane (1894–1980), lawyer and politician, U.S. Representative for Texas

Sport 
 Bob McFarlane (athlete) (1927–2006), Canadian runner and professional football player
 Danny McFarlane (born 1972), Jamaican hurdler in the 2000 and 2004 Olympics
 David McFarlane (footballer) (b. 1979), Scottish footballer
 Don McFarlane (athlete, born 1926), Canadian runner in the 1948 Olympics
 Don McFarlane (athlete, born 1931), Canadian runner in the 1952 Olympics
 Mike McFarlane (born 1960), British sprinter in the 1988 Olympics
 Óscar McFarlane (born 1980), Panamanian football goalkeeper
 Ross McFarlane (footballer) (born 1961), former Scottish football defender
 Ross McFarlane (born 1961), English golfer
 Steve McFarlane, Australian rugby league footballer
 Tom McFarlane (1872-?), Scottish footballer
 Tommy McFarlane, Scottish/American soccer player
 Tracey McFarlane (born 1966), American Olympic swimmer in the 1988 Olympics
 Willie McFarlane (born 1907), professional sprinter

Arts 
 Andrew McFarlane (Australian actor) (born 1951), Australian actor
 Colin McFarlane (born 1961), English actor, voice actor and narrator
 Fiona McFarlane (born 1978), Australian author
 Rory McFarlane, British musician
 Howard McFarlane (1894–1983), English jazz trumpeter
 Leslie McFarlane (1902–1977), Canadian journalist and novelist; ghostwriter of the Hardy Boys series
 Shona McFarlane (1929–2001), New Zealand artist, journalist, and broadcaster
 Todd McFarlane (born 1961), Canadian cartoonist, comic book writer, artist, toy manufacturer/designer

Others 
 Andrew McFarlane (disambiguation), multiple people
 Brian McFarlane (born 1931), Canadian television sportscaster
 Ian McFarlane (born 1959), Australian music journalist
 John McFarlane (born 1947), former chief executive of the Australia and New Zealand Banking Group
 K. B. McFarlane (1903–1966), British historian
 Stuart McFarlane (1885–1970), Australian public servant
 William McFarlane (disambiguation), multiple people

Fictional characters 
 Kenny McFarlane, character in Marvel Comics Ultimate Universe
 Characters in the BBC soap opera EastEnders
 Josie McFarlane
 Kim McFarlane
 Mick McFarlane (EastEnders)
 Chuck McFarlane, character in Chuck's Choice

See also 
 McFarland (disambiguation)
 MacFarland
 McFarlan (disambiguation)
 Macfarlan (disambiguation)
 MacFarlane (disambiguation)
 McFarlane (disambiguation)

Anglicised Scottish Gaelic-language surnames

de:McFarlane